See also Highland dress, belted plaid.

An earasaid, or arasaid is a draped garment worn in Scotland as part of traditional female highland dress. It may be a belted plaid (literally, a belted blanket), or an unbelted wrap. Traditionally, earasaids might be plain, striped  or tartan; they might be brightly coloured or made of lachdan (dun or undyed) wool. Some colours were more expensive than others. Modern highland dress makes earasaids from the same heraldic tartan cloth used for kilts.

Overview
In cut, it is a rectangle, longer than the wearer is tall, and wider than the wearer's waist circumference. The bottom edge is ankle length and the top edge, when not being used as a hood, may hang cape-like behind. The width may be pleated until it will wrap around the waist, and the pleats held under a belt. In this case, the cloth below the belt hangs like a skirt; the cloth above the belt may be pinned or pulled over the head. The plaid may also be worn unbelted; and it seems it was also later worn at waist-width (see images below).

Near the end of the seventeenth century, Martin Martin gave a description of traditional women's clothing in the Western Islands, including the earasaid and its brooches and buckles."The ancient dress wore by the women, and which is yet wore by some of the vulgar, called arisad, is a white plaid, having a few small stripes of black, blue and red; it reached from the neck to the heels, and was tied before on the breast with a buckle of silver or brass, according to the quality of the person. I have seen some of the former of an hundred marks value; it was broad as any ordinary pewter plate, the whole curiously engraven with various animals etc. There was a lesser buckle which was wore in the middle of the larger, and above two ounces weight; it had in the centre a large piece of crystal, or some finer stone, and this was set all around with several finer stones of a lesser size. The plaid being pleated all round, was tied with a belt below the breast; the belt was of leather, and several pieces of silver intermixed with the leather like a chain. The lower end of the belt has a piece of plate about eight inches long, and three in breadth, curiously engraven; the end of which was adorned with fine stones, or pieces of red coral. They wore sleeves of scarlet cloth, closed at the end as men's vests, with gold lace round them, having plate buttons with fine stones. The head dress was a fine kerchief of linen strait (tight) about the head, hanging down the back taper-wise; a large lock of hair hangs down their cheeks above their breast, the lower end tied with a knot of ribbands."

The 1845 illustration is a reconstruction based on this description, then a century and a half old. Somewhat older drawings from life do not show details of the garment:

Descriptions of women's plaids

One early (early 19th century) dictionary definition of "earasaid" describes it, in the past tense, as full-length and worn without underclothing. Martin Martin describes it a full-length and worn over a sleeved top. Later descriptions (notably Burt) use the word "plaid" to describe, at first, wraps that cover the whole body, and then garments that cover only from head to waist. Poorer people are described as wearing full-length blankets.

Historical example
Christina Young spun, dyed, and wove a surviving tartan plaid; it has the year "1726" and the maker's initials stitched into the edge.; it dates from before Highland dress was banned. A reconstruction in the Scottish Tartans Museum is  displayed worn as an earasaid, although there is some doubt as to whether this is accurate.

References

Notes

Footnotes

External links
 Before the Clearances: 17th- and 18th-century Scottish costume
 Musings on the Arisaid and other female dress
 Historical Highland dress by period

Scottish clothing
History of clothing
Folk costumes